"Nørgaard" is the fifth single from English indie rock band the Vaccines from their debut album, What Did You Expect from The Vaccines?. The single was released on digital download and 7" vinyl in the United Kingdom on 19 August 2011. Prior to its single release, however, the song appeared in the film Diary of a Wimpy Kid: Rodrick Rules on 25 March 2011, two weeks after What Did You Expect from The Vaccines? was released.

Music video
A music video to accompany the release of "Nørgaard" was first released onto YouTube on 6 July 2011; at a total length of one minute and thirty-nine seconds. In the music video, the band is staged in a photoshoot with young Danish model Amanda Nørgaard, about whom the song was written.

Track listing

Credits and personnel
Lead vocals – The Vaccines
Producers – Dan Grech-Marguerat
Lyrics –  The Vaccines
Label: Columbia Records

Charts

Certifications

Release history

References

2011 singles
The Vaccines songs
Columbia Records singles